Jimmy Jones (20 April 1889 – 13 June 1955) was an Australian rules footballer who played with Essendon in the Victorian Football League (VFL).

Notes

External links 
		

1889 births
1955 deaths
Australian rules footballers from Victoria (Australia)
Essendon Football Club players